Pahdamaleda Airport is an airport in Bajawa, Flores, Indonesia.

References

Airports in East Nusa Tenggara

id:Bandar Udara Soa